Arbin Zejnullai (born 15 February 1999) is a North Macedonia-born Albanian footballer who plays as a midfielder for Egnatia and the Albania national football team.

Career

Early career
Born in Tetovo, Zejnullai spent his youth career with local club Shkëndija, notably competing with the club's under-19 team during their first appearance in the UEFA Youth League during the 2017–18 season. The club would be eliminated during the first round, falling 2–1 on aggregate to Slovak champions Nitra. As a child, he served as a ball boy for the club.

Shkëndija
Zejnullai made his senior debut for Shkëndija in March 2016, coming on as a 75th-minute substitute for Marjan Radeski in a 4–0 league victory over Metalurg. After making just two appearances during his short opening season with the club, Zejnullai was used as a rotation option over the next few seasons, making just nine and six starts respectively in the following two league seasons. In July 2017, he scored his first competitive goal for the club, scoring late in Shkëndija's 4–0 first qualifying round victory over Dacia in the UEFA Europa League. In the process, he became the club's youngest scorer in European competition. In December of that year, he would score his first league goal for the club, scoring in the 90th minute of a 3–0 victory over Pelister. His 2017–18 was interrupted by injury in January 2018, as he suffered a broken metatarsal in training. In November 2019, Zejnullai signed a three-year contract extension with the club.

Ahead of the 2020–21 campaign, Zejnullai broke into the first team, making 28 league appearances over the course of the season. At the end of the season, Zejnullai and Shkëndija parted ways by mutual consent.

Rabotnički
After a short stint with Croatian club Lokomotiva in which he failed to make a first team appearance, Zejnullai returned to North Macedonia to join Rabotnički in January 2022. He scored his first goal for the club later that month, in a 3–0 friendly victory over Russian club Fakel Voronezh. He would make his league debut for the club in mid-February; one of just 15 competitive appearances that he'd make before leaving Rabotnički in the summer.

Egnatia
In July 2022, Zejnullai moved to Kategoria Superiore club Egnatia, signing a three-year contract. The club's seventh signing of the summer, he reportedly had an offer to remain with Rabotnički, but positive interactions with Egnatia's club president and Zejnullai's desire to play in Albania's domestic league proved strong factors. He made his competitive debut for the club on 20 August 2022, appearing in the club's opening day defeat to Partizani Tirana. In the second meeting between the two clubs, on 30 October, Zejnullai scored a brace in a 3–0 victory for Egnatia, marking his first goal for the club.

International
Born in North Macedonia, Zejnullai is also eligible to play for Albania. After initially appearing in the U18 ranks for North Macedonia, he confirmed his decision to represent Albania in 2018. In September, he was called into the U21 squad, alongside Shkëndija teammate Shefit Shefiti, for a pair of matches against Spain and Italy.

In November 2022, Zejnullai was called up to the senior national team for a friendly match against Qatar. One of four potential debutants on the roster, Zejnullai would not appear in the match.

Career statistics

Club

Honors
KF Shkëndija
Macedonian First Football League Champions: 2017–18, 2018–19, 2020–21

References

External links
Arbin Zejnullai at UEFA

1999 births
Living people
Albanian footballers
Albania youth international footballers
North Macedonia youth international footballers
Sportspeople from Tetovo
KF Shkëndija players
FK Rabotnički players
Macedonian First Football League players
Kategoria Superiore players
Association football midfielders
KS Egnatia Rrogozhinë players